The Voice of Conscience is a 1917 American silent drama film directed by Edwin Carewe and starring Francis X. Bushman, Beverly Bayne, and Harry S. Northrup. It was released on November 19, 1917.

Cast list
 Francis X. Bushman as William Potter/James Houston
 Beverly Bayne as Allane Houston
 Harry S. Northrup as Dick Liggett
 Maggie Breyer as Mrs. Wallace Houston
 Pauline Dempsey as Aunt Jennie
 Walter Broussard as Crazy Pete
 Anthony Byrd as Uncle Mose

References

External links 
 
 
 

Metro Pictures films
Films directed by Edwin Carewe
American silent feature films
American black-and-white films
1917 drama films
1917 films
Silent American drama films
Films produced by B. A. Rolfe
1910s English-language films
1910s American films